Jay M. Robbins (born December 2, 1945, in Pasadena, California) is an American trainer in thoroughbred horse racing based in California. He is the son of veterinarian Dr. Jack Robbins, President and founding Director of Oak Tree Racing Association.

Jay Robbins trained Tiznow, who won the Eclipse Award for Horse of the Year in 2000 and who is the only horse to win two Breeders' Cup Classic races.

References
 Jay Robbins profile at the NTRA

American horse trainers
People from Pasadena, California
1945 births
Living people